Makanda Township is one of sixteen townships in Jackson County, Illinois, USA.  As of the 2010 census, its population was 4,353 and it contained 2,052 housing units.

Geography

Cities, towns, villages
 Carbondale (south edge)
 Makanda

Unincorporated towns
 Boskydell at 
 Stone Fort at 
(This list is based on USGS data and may include former settlements.)

Adjacent townships
 Carbondale Township (north)
 Pomona Township (west)
 Murphysboro Township (northwest)

Cemeteries
The township contains these thirteen cemeteries: Boskydell, Evergreen, Hilton, Lirley, Makanda, Rowan, Sheppard, South County Line, Stearns, Union Hills, Wilkins, Zimmerman and Zion.

Major highways
  U.S. Route 51

Lakes
 Little Grassy Lake (Illinois)
 Spring Arbor Lake

Landmarks
 Giant City State Park

Demographics

School districts
Unity Point District 140 and Carbondale Community Consolidated High School in Carbondale, IL

Political districts
 Illinois' 12th congressional district
 State House District 115
 State Senate District 58

References
 
 United States Census Bureau 2007 TIGER/Line Shapefiles
 United States National Atlas

External links
 City-Data.com
 Illinois State Archives

Townships in Jackson County, Illinois
Townships in Illinois